Dmitrijs Žabotinskis (born 19 January 1980) is a Latvian ice hockey goaltender, who plays for the HK Kurbads. Žabotinskis has played several games for team Latvia. He made Latvian world championship roster in 2008 and 2009 championships

References

1980 births
Living people
People from Ogre, Latvia
Latvian ice hockey goaltenders
ASK/Ogre players
HK Liepājas Metalurgs players
HK Riga players
HK Riga 2000 players